(born April 6, 1980) is a Japanese video game composer. He is employed by Capcom. Narita is notable for working on a few games from the Monster Hunter franchise and Resident Evil 5. He recently led the music team of Resident Evil 6.

Discography
Monster Hunter Freedom (2005) – with Masato Kohda and Yuko Komiyama.
Monster Hunter 2 (Dos) (2006) – with Masato Kohda, Yuko Komiyama, Shinya Okada and Hajime Hyakkoku.
Lost Planet: Extreme Condition (2006) - with Shuji Uchiyama.
Monster Hunter Freedom 2 (2007) – with Masato Kohda and Yuko Komiyama.
Devil May Cry 4 (2008) - with Tetsuya Shibata, Kento Hasegawa, Masami Ueda, Shusaku Uchiyama, Kota Suzuki, Rei Kondoh, CHAMY.Ishi, Shinichiro Sato.
Resident Evil 5 (2009) - with Kota Suzuki, Hideki Okugawa and Seiko Kobuchi.
Resident Evil 6 (2012) - with Akiyuki Morimoto, Azusa Kato, Kota Suzuki, Thomas Parisch and Laurent Ziliani, Daniel Lindholm, Sebastian Schwartz.
Monster Hunter: World (2018) - with Zhenlan Kang, Yuko Komiyama, Masato Kouda, Tadayoshi Makino.

References

External links
 
 

Capcom people
20th-century Japanese composers
21st-century Japanese composers
Japanese male composers
Living people
Video game composers
1980 births
20th-century Japanese male musicians
21st-century Japanese male musicians